Paracalliopiidae is a family of amphipods, containing the following genera:
Doowia Barnard & Drummond, 1987
Indocalliope Barnard & Karaman, 1982
Katacalliope Barnard & Drummond, 1984
Paracalliope Stebbing, 1899
Yhi Barnard & Thomas, 1991

References

Gammaridea
Crustacean families